North Lakes bus station, also known as North Lakes Station, is the primary bus terminus in North Lakes, Queensland, Australia. It is located at the corner of Endeavour Boulevard and The Corso.

It is served by 11 routes operated by Hornibrook Bus Lines, Thompsons Bus Service and Kangaroo Bus Lines. Before opening in 2013, buses previously departed from the nearby Westfield North Lakes. It is a short walk from Westfield North Lakes, making it convenient for public transport connections to nearby areas and train services.

Bus routes 
The following bus routes services North Lakes bus station:

References

External links 

 North Lakes bus station Translink
Bus stations in Brisbane
Queen Street, Brisbane
Transport infrastructure completed in 1988
1988 establishments in Australia